Bonvar Shami (also Romanized as Bonvār Shāmī, Benvār-e Shāmī, and Bonvār-e Shāmī; also known as Bonvar) is a village in Shamsabad Rural District, in the Central District of Dezful County, Khuzestan Province, Iran. At the 2006 census, its population was 715, in 152 families.

References 

Populated places in Dezful County